Lake Naplás (Hungarian: Naplás-tó, officially called Szilas-pataki flood control reservoir) is the largest lake of Budapest. The lake is artificial, surrounded by the second largest natural reserve of Budapest, including a moorland and a forest. Rare flora and fauna could be found here, therefore it has been a protected since 1997. It is the natural habitat of the European pond turtle. The lake itself is a fishing lake, but there are hiking and biking trails around it. It can be reached from the city by car or bike, or by the nearby public transportation.

Notes

References

Naplas
16th District of Budapest